(German: "spiral of justice") is a relief carving of a poem at the pilgrimage church of St. Valentin in Kiedrich, in Hesse, Germany. The text is carved in the form of a spiral on the front of one of the pews for the congregation, creating possibly the earliest known shape poem in the German language. The carving is one of several decorative designs on the pews in the church, and was created in 1510 by the master carpenter Erhart Falckener.

History 
The pews, including the spiral of justice, were commissioned by the former minister of Kiedrich, Zweifuss, who also went by the Latin name . The artist was Erhart Falckener, a master carpenter, who made the relief carving in late Gothic style in 1510. He created a spiral of text surrounded by flower ornaments of acanthus (left) and thistle (right). The tendrils are stylized and include a caricature in the form of a human face in profile, just above and to the right of the last letter of the word "" (lost). The church and its late Gothic interior have remained intact over the centuries, a very rare case.

Text 
The text is carved in German in capital letters, creating in a spiral read from the centre outwards. The original German text, and two possible translations into modern English, read:

Analysis 

The church contains other decorative carvings. Unlike other more traditional ribbons and text inscriptions by Falckener, this text can be read as a call for social justice and religious integrity during the time of the Reformation, a few years before the Palatine Peasants' War of 1525. The content of the text recalls the struggle of the virtues and vices described by the early Christian poet Prudentius in his work Psychomachia.

The topic of the spiral, an outcry for justice ("") is the theme of a 2015–2016 exposition planned in Mainz about life at the mid-Rhine at the wake of the Reformation ("").

Roland Stark 
The first lines of the text are used as the epigraph of the 2013 crime fiction book  (Death in the Abbey Garden) by Roland Stark.

Sources 
 Werner Kremer,  (documentation), Förderkreis Kiedricher Geschichts- und Kulturzeugen, Kiedrich im Rheingau 2010
 H. Sobel,  (Erhart Falckener's church furniture and his workshop with special consideration of flat-cutting), self-published via Gesellschaft für Mittelrheinische Kirchengeschichte (Society for Middle Rhine Church History), Mainz 1980 (Dissertation)

References

External links 

1510 works
16th-century inscriptions
German art
Inscriptions